Ori Shochat (born 2 September 1978) is an Israeli record producer. Shochat is considered one of the most influential people in the Israeli hip hop scene.

Early life 
Shochat was born in Rosh Pinna. In his youth his family moved to Brussels for 2 years followed by a year in Detroit enabling his father's work. In the 1990s he was a part of "HaRevia HaPotahat".

Career 
In 2010 Shochat released his first album Ochel Sratim, which was recorded in 2005.

In 2012 he released his second album Always Ready, with a guest appearance by Israeli rapper Nechi Nech. In 2018 he released another album named Unicorn, with guest appearances by Michael Moshonov and Charlie Babz.

Together with Michael Cohen, He produced every album for the Israeli rapper Peled.

In 2019 he produced a collaboration album with the Israeli rapper, Noroz named Avud.

In 2022 he produced a collaboration album with the Israeli artist Tohat "nissim"

In 2022 he released his first own producer album for the Israeli market "Shochatoda" which features guest appearances from Ravid Plotnik (FKA Nechi Nech), Tuna, Lukach, Peled, Teddy Neguse, Eden Derso, Michael Cohen, Michael Moshonov, Roy Kafri, Boi Ecchi and more.

Shochat began to serve as a record producer as a high school student and as a soldier in the Israeli Defence Force, especially for the Israeli rapper, Subliminal.

Shochat worked with many Israeli hip hop artists, including Tamer Nafar, Nechi Nech, Roy Kafri, Cohen@Mushon, Sagol 59 and Ron Nesher.

Discography

Studio albums

EPs

Singles

Guest appearances

Remixes

See also
Israeli hip hop
Music of Israel

References 

Israeli composers
Israeli artists
Jewish rappers
Israeli rappers
1978 births
Israeli hip hop record producers
21st-century Israeli male musicians
20th-century Israeli male musicians
Jewish Israeli musicians
Living people
Musicians from Tel Aviv